Tarquinio Provini (29 May 1933 – 6 January 2005) was an Italian professional Grand Prix motorcycle road racer. He was a two-time world champion in road racing. Provini was also a four-time Isle of Man TT winner  and won 13 Italian national championships.

Motorcycling career
Provini was born in Roveleto di Cadeo, Emilia-Romagna, the son of a garage owner and grew up around engines and machinery. He began riding motorcycles at the age of 10. He began racing in 1949 despite being too young by using his uncle's name on his racing license. In 1954, he won the Motogiro of Italy. He moved up to Grand Prix competition in the middle of the 1954 season and won the Spanish Grand Prix at the end of the year. He won the 1957 FIM 125cc World Championship riding for the Italian Mondial factory. In 1958, he won the 250cc World Championship for MV Agusta.

When MV Agusta quit racing in the smaller classes, Provini signed to race for the Moto Morini factory. In 1963 he waged a season-long battle with Honda's Jim Redman for the 250 world championship. Each rider won four races and the title wasn't decided until the final race in Japan, with Redman winning the championship over Provini by two points. In 1966, he suffered a serious crash at the Isle of Man TT that broke his back, forcing his retirement. Provini redirected his energies and co-founded the  company which specialized in making scale racing bike models outside Bologna. He died in Bologna in 2005.

Motorcycle Grand Prix results 

(key) (Races in italics indicate fastest lap)

References

External links
 Protar homepage

1933 births
2005 deaths
Sportspeople from the Province of Piacenza
Italian motorcycle racers
250cc World Championship riders
125cc World Championship riders
50cc World Championship riders
Isle of Man TT riders
250cc World Riders' Champions
125cc World Riders' Champions